Chime Financial, Inc. is an American financial technology company which provides fee-free mobile banking services that are provided by The Bancorp Bank or Stride Bank, N.A. Account-holders are issued Visa debit cards or credit cards and have access to an online banking system accessible through the company's website or via its mobile apps. Chime earns the majority of its revenue from the collection of interchange fees. 

Chime is not a bank and Chime customers do not have a customer relationship with its banks. Chime can and does cancel user accounts with no notice, it is not required to provide a reason for the cancellation to the customer or even have a reason. Customers cannot appeal to banking regulators to retrieve their deposits, which may not be returned in a timely fashion.

Chime has no physical branches and does not charge monthly or overdraft fees, nor does it require an opening deposit or minimum balance to open a free checking account. As of February 2020, Chime had 8 million account holders. Bank accounts that are provided via Chime's partners are FDIC insured up to the standard maximum deposit insurance amount of $250,000. So far the accounts are only available for individuals of personal accounts; all money received must be in the name of the individual account owner.

History

Chime was founded by Chris Britt (CEO) and Ryan King (CTO) in 2012  in San Francisco, California as an alternative to traditional banking with a mission of creating financial peace of mind. The company launched publicly on April 15, 2014 on the Dr. Phil Show. As of 2020, Chime has raised $1.5 billion in private funding. 

In 2018, Chime acquired Pinch, a startup focused on helping millennials and young adults build their credit scores by reporting on-time rent payments to credit bureaus. Pinch's co-founders joined Chime's team as a part of the acquisition.

On October 16, 2019, Chime experienced a service outage leaving users without access to their deposits. The issue was resolved the next day.

In January 2020, Chime announced a partnership with the Dallas Mavericks as their jersey sponsor as a part of a multi-year deal.

In April 2020, in response to the financial strain of the COVID-19 pandemic, Chime announced a pilot program to provide users who e-filed tax returns with the IRS a $1,200 advance on the Economic Stimulus Payment via SpotMe, Chime's fee-free overdraft product.  Chime later announced the successful processing of over $375,000,000 in stimulus payments 1 week ahead of the scheduled government disbursement date.

In February 2022, Chime along with Meta Platforms sued 2 Nigerians accused of impersonating Chime on social media platforms. 

In February 2022, Chime announced it would delay its IPO until later in 2022.

The company announced it was terminating 12% of its workforce in November 2022.

Funding 
In August 2021, Chime Financial raised $750 million in a series G funding round, led by investor Sequoia Capital Global Equities. This values the company at about $25 billion.

Consumer and regulatory problems

Marketing as a bank
Chime, which is not a bank, in 2021 came to agreements with two state financial regulators, the California Department of Financial Protection and Innovation and the Illinois Department of Financial and Professional Regulation, to stop representing itself as a bank. The company agreed to stop using the URL "chimebank.com", change its use of the word "bank" in marketing, and add disclaimers to its marketing and product text. It paid $200,000 in the settlement with Illinois.

Account closures, difficulty recovering deposits
In July 2021, ProPublica published an article detailing Chime's record of closing customer accounts without notice or explanation, sometimes refusing to return customer deposits. Chime has attributed the closures to the accidental byproduct of fraud prevention.

In 2022 Chime's practice of closing customer accounts without notice or explanation was again reported. The company has no obligation to provide a reason, or even have a reason, to close an account. As of the November, 2022 report the Consumer Financial Protection Bureau had received 3,500 complaints about Chime since the beginning of 2020. Customers with closed accounts sometimes had difficulty retrieving their deposits in a timely fashion. Since Chime customers are not customers of any bank, their recourse is often limited.

Products 

Chime offers various fee-free banking products, including checking accounts with no minimum balance, an automated savings feature, and early wage access.

In September 2019, Chime launched SpotMe, a fee-free overdraft service where customers can overdraw their accounts up to $100 without incurring an overdraft fee; once the overdraft limit is reached, purchases will be declined but no traditional negative balance fees charged. 

Chime launched Credit Builder in June 2020, a credit card designed to help consumers build their credit history.

See also 

 Financial technology
 Challenger bank
 Payment card industry

References

Financial technology companies
American companies established in 2012
Financial services companies based in California
Financial services companies established in 2012
Companies based in San Francisco
Neobanks